The FV603 Saracen is a six-wheeled armoured personnel carrier designed and produced by Alvis since 1952. It has been used by a variety of operators around the world, and is still in use in secondary roles in some countries. The Saracen became a recognisable vehicle as a result of its part in the policing of Northern Ireland as well as for its role in the South African government's enforcement of apartheid.

History

The FV603 Saracen was the armoured personnel carrier of Alvis's FV600 series. Besides the driver and commander, a squad of eight soldiers plus a troop commander could be carried. Most models carried a small turret on the roof, carrying a Browning .30 machine gun. A .303 Bren gun could be mounted on an anti-aircraft ring-mount accessed through a roof hatch and there were ports on the sides through which troops could fire. Although removed from active service, it saw extensive use into the 1980s in Northern Ireland and was a familiar sight, nicknamed 'sixers', during "The Troubles". At times, they appeared on the streets of Hull, a less-hostile atmosphere for driver training in a city of similar appearance to Belfast, and only a few miles from the Army School of Mechanical Transport.

As a member of the FV 600 series, it shared a similar chassis to the FV601 Saladin armoured car, the Salamander airfield crash truck and the Stalwart high mobility load carrier. The punt chassis, suspension and H-drive drivetrain remained similar, but the engine, transmission and braking systems varied significantly.

The Saracen was in turn used as an armoured personnel carrier, armoured command vehicle and ambulance. The FV 603 model saw many variants in detail, including radio or command fitments and specialist equipment for artillery or signals use.

The Saracen series also includes:
 FV 604 armoured command vehicle (ACV): with extra radio equipment and distinctive "penthouse" roof extensions to support.
 FV 610 armoured command post Royal Artillery (ACP): no turret and higher roof to the armoured compartment allowed headroom for the battery command post officer and technical assistants of the Royal Artillery to sit at a fitted table and use their plotting instruments and ALS 21 in front of the command post officer. There were also fittings for a canvas penthouse to the rear and sides. A small generator was sometimes carried on a front wing.
 FV 606 / FV 611 armoured ambulance.

Saracen was produced before Saladin because of the urgent need for a personnel carrier to serve in the Malayan Emergency, entering production in 1952.

The Saracen was produced both with and without turrets fitted. They are popular with collectors due to their prices being as low as $20,000 in Australia and $11,000 in the Czech Republic.

Combat history
 Aden Emergency
 Malayan Emergency
 Nigerian civil war
 Sri Lankan civil war
 The Troubles
 Yom Kippur war
 Soweto uprising
 Lebanese Civil War

Operators

Military operators

  Amal Movement: Inherited from the Lebanese Armed Forces (LAF).
 – Australian Army: 30 vehicles, registered consecutively as 115361 through 115390.
 – Biafran Army: 1
 - Royal Brunei Land Forces: 15
 – Indonesian Army: 55; some modernised by request in 1994.
 – Royal Jordanian Army: 120; 60 operational.
 - Kenyan Army: 15
 - Kuwaiti Army: 135
 - Lebanese Ground Forces: 100
 - Libyan Army: 15
 – Mauritanian Army: 5 ordered in 1990.
 – Nigerian Army: 20; 10 operational.
 – Qatar Emiri Land Force: 30
 – South African Army: 280 ordered between 1953 and 1956. All working Saracens refurbished in 1979 and some sold to local security contractors; at least one modified with a Comet tank turret for Rooikat trials. Retired from the South African Armoured Corps in 1991.
 – Sri Lanka Army: 67, All were removed out of service in the mid 1990s.
 – Sudanese Army: 50
 – Royal Thai Army: 20
 – United Arab Emirates Army: 20
 – British Army

Civil operators
 British Hong Kong – Royal Hong Kong Police Force: Retired in 1988 when replaced by the Saxon with all working Saracens shipped back to England. Most were used by the PTU with the 1st Saracen on static display at PTU HQ.
 – South African Police: 8
 – Royal Ulster Constabulary
Space Hijackers – 2007–present – Mark 1 Saracen used for publicity stunts

Tulsa Police Department, 1; Saracen hull re-mounted on a commercial truck chassis
Sierra Vista Police Department, 1; SWAT
San Francisco Police Department, 1; SWAT
Snohomish County Sheriff, 1; SWAT

Variants

Saracens were initially equipped with an L3A4 (0.30-inch Browning) machine gun in the turret, and a Bren light machine gun for the gun-ring at the rear of the vehicle. Later Marks carried the LMG, and L37 GPMG.

Mk 1: Early version with a small 3-door turret and turret weapon ports.
Mk 2: Modified Mark 1 with later two-door turret. The rear turret door folds down and can act as a seat for the commander.
Mk 3: Reverse-flow cooling for use in hot climates.
Mk 4: Prototype only.
Mk 5: Mark 1 or Mark 2 vehicles modified with extra armour specifically for use in Northern Ireland.
Mk 6: Mark 3 modified with extra armour as for the Mk 5 for use in Northern Ireland.
Concept 3 New Generation Armoured Car: Mk 3 suspension and drive train with chassis redesigned by the South African Defence Force to accept a 77mm HV tank gun. Prototype only.

In popular culture
A Saracen masquerades as a German armoured car in the 1964 film 633 Squadron, which was set during World War II, a decade before the Saracen was first built.

In the 1967 episode "Mission... Highly Improbable" of the TV series The Avengers (the penultimate episode with Diana Rigg in the female leading role), the villainous Dr Matthew Chivers (played by Francis Matthews) is trying to smuggle a Saracen FV 603 out of a British Army testing area by shrinking it to toy size with the help of a machine invented by his boss Professor Rushton (played by Noel Howlett).

In the Tom Sharpe novel Riotous Assembly, a Saracen is destroyed by an elephant gun fired by Constable Els of the South African Police.

In the 1983 debut album Script for a Jester's Tear, by British progressive rock group Marillion, the Saracen was referred to in the final song: "...crawling behind a Saracen's hull from the safety of his living room chair..." The lyrics of Forgotten Sons describe the conflict in Northern Ireland and the discrepancy between what was really happening and the perception of the conflict by the British public.

In the Irish rebel music song Kinky Boots (a parody of The Combine Harvester) reference is made to the Saracen in the opening line of the song.

In the 1984 Indonesian film Pengkhianatan G30S/PKI, Saracens were used by the Indonesian Army and the Kostrad as patrol vehicles during the infamous 30 September Movement coup d'etat. Saracens are also used as transport during state funerals of the six Army generals who became victims of the coup.

Saracens were used almost unchanged in the 1995 film of Judge Dredd as carriers for prisoners and personnel carriers for Judges. 101 FCs were used as the basis for taxis, fitted with a prop bodyshell.

The Saracen is mentioned in the Irish Republican song "Little Armalite".

In the 1992 film The Crying Game, on the main characters is killed, "he were run over by a Saracen" when he attempts to escape his IRA captors.

During the 2009 G-20 demonstrations in London, members of the Space Hijackers protest group drove their Saracen into the City of London and parked it outside the Royal Bank of Scotland in Bishopsgate. The Saracen, which had been painted bright blue with black and white chequered stripes, was equipped with CCTV and marked "RIOT" (but not "police"). The group were reportedly there to protect the RBS building from "bad" demonstrators, although the police declined their assistance. Instead, the vehicle was searched and police questioned the protestors, who were dressed in plain blue overalls and helmets. The vehicle's eleven occupants were arrested for impersonating police officers and for traffic offences, and were later charged with impersonating police officers, although the case was dropped before coming to court.

A community protest against the sale of heritage-listed Fort Largs by the state government of South Australia took place on 25 October 2014. The protest, organised by the National Trust of SA, featured an Alvis Saracen and other vintage military vehicles.

See also
 Land Rover Tangi

References

External links

 Globalsecurity.org
 Clash-of-steel.co.uk
 Warwheels.net
 Saracen of the San Francisco Police Department SWAT team in action
 SFPD Saracen

Armoured personnel carriers of the United Kingdom
Armoured personnel carriers of the Cold War
Saracen
Military vehicles introduced in the 1950s
Cold War armoured fighting vehicles of the United Kingdom
Six-wheeled vehicles
Wheeled armoured personnel carriers